The 2020 Atlético Ottawa season was the first season in the history of Atlético Ottawa.

It was announced on January 29, 2020, that Atlético Madrid had gained the approval of the Canadian Premier League to form an expansion club in the city of Ottawa, Ontario.

On March 20, 2020, the league announced a postponement of the start of the season due to the COVID-19 pandemic. On July 29, 2020, the league announced that the season would be played in Charlottetown, Prince Edward Island, beginning August 13, in an event dubbed "The Island Games."

Current squad 
As of August 13, 2020

Transfers

In

Loan In

Out

Loans Out

Canadian Premier League

First stage

Table

Results by match

Matches

Statistics

Squad and statistics 

|-

|}

Top scorers 
{| class="wikitable sortable alternance"  style="font-size:85%; text-align:center; line-height:14px; width:85%;"
|-
!width=10|Rank
!width=10|Nat.
! scope="col" style="width:275px;"|Player
!width=10|Pos.
!width=80|Canadian Premier League
!width=80|TOTAL
|-
|rowspan=2|1|||| Francisco Acuña || MF || 2 ||2
|-
||| Malcolm Shaw || FW || 2 ||2
|-
|rowspan=3|3|||| Mohamed Kourouma || MF || 1 ||1
|-
||| Ben Fisk || MF || 1 ||1
|-
||| Viti Martínez || MF || 1 ||1
|-
|- class="sortbottom"
| colspan="4"|Totals||7||7

Top assists 
{| class="wikitable sortable alternance"  style="font-size:85%; text-align:center; line-height:14px; width:85%;"
|-
!width=10|Rank
!width=10|Nat.
! scope="col" style="width:275px;"|Player
!width=10|Pos.
!width=80|Canadian Premier League
!width=80|TOTAL
|-
|1|||| Francisco Acuña        || MF || 2 ||2
|-
|rowspan=3|2|||| Malyk Hamilton || MF || 1 ||1
|-
||| Vashon Neufville         || DF || 1 ||1
|-
||| Malcolm Shaw || FW || 1 ||1
|-
|- class="sortbottom"
| colspan="4"|Totals||5||5

Clean sheets 
{| class="wikitable sortable alternance"  style="font-size:85%; text-align:center; line-height:14px; width:85%;"
|-
!width=10|Rank
!width=10|Nat.
! scope="col" style="width:275px;"|Player
!width=80|Canadian Premier League
!width=80|TOTAL
|-
|1|||| Nacho Zabal        || 2 ||2
|-
|- class="sortbottom"
| colspan="3"|Totals||2||2

Disciplinary record 
{| class="wikitable sortable alternance"  style="font-size:85%; text-align:center; line-height:14px; width:85%;"
|-
!rowspan="2" width=10|No.
!rowspan="2" width=10|Pos.
!rowspan="2" width=10|Nat.
!rowspan="2" scope="col" style="width:275px;"|Player
!colspan="2" width=80|Canadian Premier League
!colspan="2" width=80|TOTAL
|-
! !!  !!  !! 
|-
|3||DF|||| Milovan Kapor    || 1 || 1 ||1||1
|-
|4||DF|||| Brandon John    || 1 || 0 ||1||0
|-
|5||MF|||| Viti Martínez    || 2 || 0 ||2||0
|-
|8||MF|||| Francisco Acuña    || 1 || 0 ||1||0
|-
|9||FW|||| Mohamed Kourouma || 1 || 0 ||1||0
|-
|10||MF|||| Ben Fisk || 1 || 0 ||1||0
|-
|11||MF|||| Antoine Coupland || 1 || 0 ||1||0
|-
|22||MF|||| Ben McKendry || 2 || 0 ||2||0
|-
|23||DF|||| Ajay Khabra    || 1 || 0 ||1||0
|-
|44||DF|||| Vashon Neufville    || 0 || 1 ||0||1
|-
|- class="sortbottom"
| colspan="4"|Totals||11||2||11||2

Notes

References

External links

Atlético Ottawa seasons
Atleti
Atleti